Schenley is an unincorporated community in Gilpin Township, Armstrong County, Pennsylvania, United States. Pennsylvania Route 2062 is the main and only highway into the community. Schenley is bordered by the Allegheny and  Kiskiminetas rivers. The town is the site of a large industrial park along the Allegheny River that contains many abandoned buildings that formerly comprised whiskey producer Schenley Distillery. One of the main businesses in the community is the Kiski Junction Railroad, which provides freight service and offers rides to tourists.

Notable person

Prominent dietitian Rena Sarah Eckman (1868-1946) was born in Schenley.

References

External links 

Kiski Junction Railroad website

Unincorporated communities in Armstrong County, Pennsylvania
Unincorporated communities in Pennsylvania